The Samsun Amisos Hill Gondola is a two-station aerial lift line of gondola type in Samsun serving the nearby hilltop Amisos.

The construction of the line completed in October 2005.

Spanning over Atatürk Boulevard towards south, the gondola lift line connects Batıpark (literally: West Park) on the Black Sea shore, a large urban park on land reclaimed from the sea, with Amisos Hill, an archaeological site. At Amisos Hill, tumuli called Baruthane Tümülüsleri (Baruthane Tumuli), are found containing tombs dating back to an era between 300 BC and 30 BC. The hill features an archaeological museum and a café-restaurant.

The number of the six-seater gondolas increased from initially two to six, which run in two sets of three cabins in a row. The gondola line is owned by the Samsun Metropolitan Municipality, which operated it until September 2013. The municipality leased the lift line to its subsidiary company for transportation, the Samulaş Inc. for a five-year term.

Features
 Length: 
 Height difference: 
 Speed: max. 3 m/s
 Ridership: 360 hourly
 Cabin capacity: 6
 Engine power: 110 kW
 Cable diameter: 43 mm
 Terminals:
 Batıpark 
 Amisos Tepesi

See also
 List of gondola lifts in Turkey

References

Gondola lifts in Turkey
2006 establishments in Turkey
Transport infrastructure completed in 2005
Tourist attractions in Samsun